In mathematics, the Ellis–Numakura lemma states that if S is a non-empty semigroup with a topology such that S is compact and the product is semi-continuous, then S has an idempotent element p, (that is, with pp = p).  The lemma is named after Robert Ellis and Katsui Numakura.

Applications
Applying this lemma to the Stone–Čech compactification βN of the natural numbers shows that there are idempotent elements in βN. The product on βN is not continuous, but is only semi-continuous (right or left, depending on the preferred construction, but never both).

Proof
By compactness and Zorn's Lemma, there is a minimal non-empty compact sub semigroup of S, so replacing S by this sub semi group we can assume S is minimal.
Choose p in S. The set Sp is a non-empty compact subsemigroup, so by minimality it is S and in  particular contains p, so the set of elements q with qp = p is non-empty.
The set of all elements q with qp = p is a compact semigroup, and is nonempty by the previous step, so by minimality it is the whole of S and therefore contains p. So pp = p.

References

External links
T. Tao lecture-5

Ergodic theory
General topology
Theorems in topology